Backtrack is a western novel by Milton Lott, published in 1965. The book is about a cattle drive from Texas to Montana, and features cowboy Ringo Rose and a Mexican boy whom he fathers. He teaches the kid skills he needs to survive, including gunfighting. When the kid shoots a man and flees, Ringo follows him across Texas to Ringo's former home. The book was made into a movie by Universal Studios in 1969.

External links 
 Google Book Search page for Backtrack, includes a review "Backtrack is a literary, psychological ... by Kirkus Reviews.

1965 American novels
Western (genre) novels
Western United States in fiction
Novels set in Texas
Houghton Mifflin books
Novels set in Montana